The Hoffner Historic District is a historic collection of buildings in the Northside neighborhood of Cincinnati, Ohio, United States.  Built primarily at the end of the nineteenth century, the district has experienced few changes since it was built, and it has been named a historic site.

The buildings are four commercial buildings along Hamilton Avenue, including the Hoffner Lodge at the corner; six small private residences on Moline Court; and the Myron Johnson Lumber Company building behind them on Langland Street. The southern portion of the block was in the 1970s occupied by a non-contributing gas station, which has since been replaced with a new apartment complex.

The district qualified for the National Register because of its distinctive historic architecture; built largely in the Italianate style, the buildings demonstrate the influence of German cultural influences in their uniform construction methods.  Several houses are located in the district, along with a train station, a Masonic lodge, and a former train station.

History 

Northside, also known as "Cumminsville", was first owned by John Cleves Symmes as part of his Symmes Purchase. Included within the boundaries of Mill Creek Township, the land was bought by Ezekiel Hutchinson and David Cummings in 1811 and 1817 respectively; the two men owned what is now the neighborhood's western and eastern portions, respectively. The estate failed to endure: Hoffner resided at the estate until his 1891 death, but the grounds were quickly subdivided and sold. Before long, the district's buildings had been constructed, and since the 1890s the neighborhood has experienced numerous changes: despite overwhelming technological advancement since the 1890s, the district retains its original appearance of a small village whose businesses can fulfill all needs of all residents within easy walking distance of their homes.

In 1978, the Hoffner Historic District was officially designated and listed on the National Register of Historic Places.

References

External links

German-American culture in Cincinnati
Historic districts in Cincinnati
Italianate architecture in Ohio
National Register of Historic Places in Cincinnati
Historic districts on the National Register of Historic Places in Ohio